Terminalia bucidoides is a species of plant in the Combretaceae family. It is found in Costa Rica, Honduras, Nicaragua, and Panama.

References

bucidoides
Endangered plants
Taxonomy articles created by Polbot